Po sveta i u nas is the flagship Bulgarian news program aired each day on the Bulgarian public television channel BNT 1, the flagship channel of Bulgarian National Television (BNT).

History

Bulgarian television 
The broadcast of "Po sveta i u nas" was started on July 20, 1960. Before this news broadcast, since November 7, 1959, news broadcasts were broadcast daily in 5 minutes.The first speaker is Nikola Filipov. The following leaders after Philipov are Maria Yanakieva, Anahid Tacheva, Georgi Lambrev, Maria Trolva, Lili Vankova, Lyubinka Nyagolova.

Bulgarian National television 
For over 20 years, the leading TV pairs of BNT news are: Radinella Busserska - Grigori Nedialkov, Radina Chervenova - Spas Kyosev and Mira Dobreva - Hristo Petko. The news of 1999 began broadcasting from the specially designed Studio 6.
Po sveta i u nas is the chronicle of Bulgaria "- words of Boyko Vasilev - Bulgarian journalist and television host.

Notable anchors 
 Nora Arsova
 Grigori Nedyalkov
 Spas Kiossev
 Radinela Buserska
 Rumen Yovchev
 Poli Zlatareva
 Daniel Mihaylov
 Tonya Dimitrova
 Georgi Lyubenov
 Marin Marinov
 Neri Terzieva
 Dimitar Tsonev
 Radina Chervenova
 Asen Agov
 Marina Mateva
 Hristina Hristova-Lyubomirova
 Nadya Obretenova
 Yuliya Naeva
 Evgeniya Atanasova-Teneva
 Dobrina Cheshmedzhieva
 Daniel Chipev
 Kostadin Filipov
 Angel Bonchev

External links 
55 years Po sveta i u nas 
50 years Po sveta i u nas - Youtube
Po sveta i u nas 1990 - Youtube

References

Поля Иванова Първа програма (Канал 1) на БНТ през периода 1959-2000 г. Поля Иванова(First Program (Channel 1) of the Bulgarian National Television between 1959 and 2000. Polya Ivanova)
"Хроника 25 години Всяка Неделя",издателство "Захари Стоянов", 2004 г.(Chronicle 25 Years Every Sunday", Zachary Stoyanov Publishing House, 2004)

Bulgarian television series
1960 Bulgarian television series debuts
Bulgarian National Television original programming